Józef Stefański (7 February 1908 – 21 December 1997) was a Polish cyclist. He competed in the individual and team road race events at the 1928 Summer Olympics. He won the 1929 edition of the Tour de Pologne.

References

External links
 

1908 births
1997 deaths
Polish male cyclists
Olympic cyclists of Poland
Cyclists at the 1928 Summer Olympics
People from Grójec County
Sportspeople from Masovian Voivodeship
Burials at Evangelical-Augsburg Cemetery, Warsaw